InStyle was an American monthly women's fashion magazine founded in 1994. It was published in the United States by Dotdash Meredith. In February 2022, it was announced that InStyle would cease print publications and move to a digital-only format.

Description
Along with advertising, the magazine offered content such as beauty, fashion, home, entertaining, philanthropy, celebrity lifestyles, feminism and human interest. Editors-in-Chief have included Martha Nelson (1993-2002), Charla Lawhon (2002-2008), Ariel Foxman (2008-2016) and Laura Brown (2017-2022).

After originating in the United States, InStyle had expanded their brand and, as of 2012, had distributed internationally to over 16 countries including Germany, Brazil, Greece, South Korea, Spain, Turkey, South Africa, Romania, and Russia. In May 2017, InStyle China was launched as part of a partnership with an existing weekly magazine, which featured Victoria Beckham on its inaugural cover. In 2018, the UK edition shifted from paper to digital version, and the Polish edition was cancelled after 10 years of publication. The InStyleUK website is inactive. 

In 2018, InStyle became the first major fashion magazine to ban photography of and advertisements featuring fur. The reason to why it became so important for the ban of fur in the magazine was for how  awful it was to showcase the type of cruelty displaying the fur of dead animals. The organization PETA was thrilled with the news and were able to celebrate with the editor Laura Brown banning the use of fur advertisements in the magazine. Since the 2000’s PETA has been on the forefront of taking consideration of animals and the cruelties thy face in modern society.

In mid-July 2020, InStyle Australian edition's publisher Bauer Media Australia and New Zealand, which had been acquired by the Sydney–based Mercury Capital, discontinued publishing the magazine, citing declining advertising revenue and travel restrictions caused by the COVID-19 pandemic.

References

External links
 Official website
 Interview with Ariel Foxman at TheodoraandCallum.com

1994 establishments in New York City
Fashion magazines published in the United States
Magazines established in 1994
Magazines published in New York City
Mercury Capital
Monthly magazines published in the United States
Women's fashion magazines
Women's magazines published in the United States
IAC (company)